Chevry-sous-le-Bignon (literally Chevry under Le Bignon) is a commune in the Loiret department in north-central France.

See also
Communes of the Loiret department

References

Chevrysouslebignon